The New York City mayoral election of 1977 occurred on Tuesday, November 8, 1977.

Incumbent mayor Abraham Beame, a Democrat, was challenged by five other Democrats, including Representative Ed Koch, New York Secretary of State Mario Cuomo, and feminist activist and former Representative Bella Abzug for the Democratic nomination. Koch won the initial vote in the Democratic primary as well as a runoff vote held between him and Cuomo. In the general election, Koch beat Cuomo, who ran on the Liberal Party ticket, and Roy M. Goodman, who ran on the Republican ticket.

Candidates

Democratic
Beame's struggles with the economy and crime, which had led to a decrease in the population of New York City, encouraged several Democrats to challenge him.

Abzug represented parts of Manhattan and the Bronx in the U.S. House. In 1975, she left her seat to run for the U.S. Senate but was narrowly defeated in the Democratic primary by Daniel Patrick Moynihan.

Cuomo, a liberal from Queens, had been appointed Secretary of State by Governor Hugh Carey in 1976, after losing the election for lieutenant governor in 1974.

Ed Koch, a Jewish politician from Greenwich Village, began his career as "just a plain liberal," but shifted rightward, towards being a "liberal with sanity".

Longtime city political figure Edward N. Costikyan led a significant campaign early in the race, but by mid-May he decided to withdraw and gave his endorsement to Koch.

Other major candidates running were Rep. Herman Badillo of the Bronx, Manhattan Borough President Percy Sutton, and civic watchdog Joel Harnett.

Republican
Roy Goodman served in the State Senate.  Barry Farber, a conservative radio talk show host, also ran.

Primaries

Liberal party
The Liberal Party convention was held on May 19, 1977.  Cuomo defeated Abzug for the nomination.

Results

Source: OurCampaigns.com

Republican primary
The Republican primary was held on September 8, 1977.  Goodman defeated Farber.

Results

Source: OurCampaigns.com

Democratic primary
The Democratic primary was held on September 8, 1977.

Koch ran to the right of the other candidates, on a "law and order" platform. According to historian Jonathan Mahler, the blackout that happened in July of that year, and the subsequent rioting, helped catapult Koch and his message of restoring public safety to front-runner status.

Bailout
In October 1975, with the city on the verge of bankruptcy, Mayor Beame asked the federal government for a bailout. President Gerald Ford refused, leading to the memorable New York Daily News headline: "Ford to City: Drop Dead".  As a result, Mayor Beame laid off many police officers and other city employees, which was followed by an increase in crime. (The next month, Ford relented in part, signing the New York City Seasonal Financing Act of 1975, which extended $2.3 billion in federal loans to the city for three years.)

A 982-page report from the Securities and Exchange Commission blamed Beame's mismanagement for the city's financial mess, which his opponents seized on as an electoral issue.

Blackout
A major blackout affected New York City from July 13, 1977 to July 14, 1977.  The blackout was localized to New York City and the immediate surroundings, and resulted in citywide looting.

Mayor Beame accused Con Edison, the power provider for New York City, of "gross negligence".  Koch criticized Beame for losing control of the streets and failing to ask Governor Carey to call in the National Guard.

Endorsements
Abzug – Local 1199, 10,000 hospital workers; Marine Engineers Benevolent Association, Shirley MacLaine, Marlo Thomas
Badillo – WCBS Radio, the West Brooklyn Independent Democrats, several Hispanic labor organizations, Chita Rivera, Raul Julia
Beame – Central Labor Council, ILGWU, UFT, TWU, John DeLury, Bert Powers, Stanley Steingut, Donald Manes
Cuomo – Governor Carey, Mario Biaggi, The New York Times, The Liberal Party, Village Voice, former Mayor Robert F. Wagner, Jr., 26 labor organizations
Harnett – Don Pippin of "A Chorus Line," Phil Newman, business
Koch – Stephen J. Solarz, New York Post, New York Daily News, Citizens Union, Bess Myerson
Sutton – Representative Charles Rangel, Amsterdam News, New York Voice, Ellen Sulzberger Straus, Nicholas Katzenbach, Allied Health Services Union, New York Ministerial Alliance, Baptist Ministers Conference of Greater New York and Vicinity

Polling

Results

Source: OurCampaigns.com

Democratic runoff campaign
As no candidate obtained the needed 40%, a runoff election was scheduled.  The Democratic Party runoff election was held on September 19, 1977 between the top two vote getters, Koch and Cuomo.

Results

Source: OurCampaigns.com

Democratic primary results by borough

General election
Though Koch won the runoff convincingly, Cuomo remained in the race as the Liberal Party nominee.

Though Governor Carey had persuaded Cuomo to run for mayor in the first place, he threw his support to Koch and urged Cuomo to stand down for the sake of party unity.  Cuomo refused.

While Koch had a reputation as a crusading reformer, that summer he quietly promised plum city jobs to the political powerbrokers in the boroughs in exchange for their support.  Cuomo ran on banning the death penalty, which backfired with New Yorkers during a time of high crime rates. Cuomo then went negative with ads that likened Koch to unpopular former mayor John Lindsay.  His supporters used the inflammatory slogan "Vote for Cuomo, Not the Homo". Meanwhile, Koch backers accused Cuomo of anti-Semitism and pelted Cuomo campaign cars with eggs.

Polling

Results

Source: OurCampaigns.com

Results by borough

Other vote was: Kenneth F. Newcombe – Communist – 5,300; Catarino Garza – Socialist Workers – 3,294; Vito Battista – United Taxpayers Party – 2,119; Louis Wein – Independent – 1,127; William Lawry – Free Libertarian – 1,068; Elijah Boyd – Labor – 873. Cuomo's total vote included 522,942 Liberal and 64,971 Neighborhood Government.

References

Mayoral election, 1977
1977
1977 New York (state) elections
New York